2520 may refer to:
 2520 (number)
 The year 2520 in the 26th century